Time To React - Live! is the first live album by Australian Thrash metal band Allegiance, released in 1995. The album was recorded live at Triple J Studios in Perth, Western Australia on 17 December 1994.

Track listing
"Chaos Dies" - 4:45
"Pity" - 2:59
"Trapped Behind A Shadow" - 3:55
"Hate Frenzy" – 4:41
"Time To React" – 4:14
"Taken By Force" - 3:19
"Torn Between Two Worlds" - 5:52
"One Step Beyond" - 4:12
"Downward Spiral" - 5:09

References

1995 live albums
Allegiance (Australian band) albums